A massive dust storm took place in Tehran on June 2, 2014 at 4:50pm (local time). 5 men were killed, more than 30 people were injured, and a few cars were destroyed. Falling trees and objects in balconies disconnected 65 of 1200 electric 20 KW lines.

During the spring of 2014, heavy rain and hailstorms struck the Iranian capital of Tehran, surprising residents and causing traffic jams across the city. The fierce June 2 hurricane, packed with thunder and lightning, battered the northern parts of Tehran and lasted for more than an hour. According to Institute of Geophysics, wind speed was 80 km/h; Meteorological Organization of Iran reported 120 km/h. Air pressure was 4 mbar.

References 

2014 in Iran
Hurricanes in Iran
Dust storms
June 2014 events in Iran